Bell Hill is a summit located in Central New York Region of New York located in the Towns of Deerfield and Schuyler. Located on the border of Oneida County and Herkimer County, northeast of Utica.

References

Mountains of Oneida County, New York
Mountains of New York (state)
Mountains of Herkimer County, New York